Kim Green is a British-Australian former racing driver who was the co-owner and Chief Executive Officer of Andretti Green Racing, a racing team in the Indycar Series.

Biographical

Green is a native of the United Kingdom who grew up in Australia. He now resides in St. Petersburg, Florida. He began  his racing career in 1981 with Newman Racing in the Can-Am series. After winning five wins and six poles during the 1981-82 racing seasons, Green joined the Champ Car team Forsythe Racing in 1983. Over the next decade, Green continued honing his managerial skills in the CART series.

Team ownership
In 1994, Green joined his brother Barry's Team Green as team manager, and competed in the 1994 CART IndyCar World Series with driver Jacques Villeneuve, eventually winning both the 1995 Indianapolis 500 and the CART PPG IndyCar World Series Cup that same year.  In 1996 Team Green became known as the Brahma Sports Team for a season, with driver Raul Boesel.  In 1997 KOOL cigarettes took over as a major sponsor with Parker Johnstone, and the team was renamed Team KOOL Green, before expanding to a two-car effort in 1998 with Paul Tracy and rising youngster Dario Franchitti. In 2001, Michael Andretti joined the team in a separate effort headed by Kim Green, known as Team Motorola. In July 2002, Andretti purchased a controlling stake in the team which became Andretti Green Racing. Shortly thereafter the team moved to the IRL IndyCar Series where it won league championships in 2004, 2005 and 2007 and the Indianapolis 500 in 2005 and 2007. Green and fellow co-owner Kevin Savoree left AGR in September 2009 to run Green Savoree Racing Promotions, an auto race promotion company.  Currently, GSRP promote Indycar Series races in St. Petersburg, Florida and Toronto, Ontario, Canada. On March 2, 2011 Green Savoree purchased the Mid-Ohio Sports Car Course and will promote races at that site as well.

Race promotion

Green co-owns Green Savoree Racing Promotions, which owns Mid-Ohio and promotes other IndyCar races at St Petersburg, Toronto and Portland.

References

IndyCar Series team owners
Can-Am
Living people
Year of birth missing (living people)

Kim Green
Firestone Grand Prix of St. Petersburg

Green Savoree Racing Promotions, Chairman and CEO

Kim Green is Chairman and Chief Executive Officer of Green Savoree Racing Promotions (GSRP), a company he co-founded in 2009 with Kevin Savoree. The Indianapolis-based company owns, operates and promotes auto-racing properties and events across North America. 

Under his leadership, and with a growing number of quality partnerships and sponsorships, GSRP has commercialized NTT INDYCAR SERIES events under the Firestone Grand Prix of St. Petersburg, Grand Prix of Portland and Honda Indy Toronto banners, as well as a full calendar of events and a renowned driving and motorcycle riding school based at the Mid-Ohio Sports Car Course – a historical racing facility in Lexington, Ohio, which GSRP purchased in 2011. Through these racing properties, Kim has been able to showcase some of the most exciting racing series on the continent including IMSA SportsCars, NTT INDYCAR SERIES, NASCAR XFINITY Series among others to international audiences.

Prior to launching GSRP with Kevin, Kim held senior ranking positions with various racing teams alongside his brother Barry Green. With Kim as the team manager and Jacques Villeneuve as the team’s driver, that pairing delivered both the 1995 Indianapolis 500 win and CART PPG IndyCar World Series Cup season championship.  In addition to their off-track successes as business partners since 1993, Kim and Kevin have also won four INDYCAR season championships, three Indianapolis 500 races, and the 12 Hours of Sebring as race team principals, and operated INDYCAR’s first street race in 2005 at St. Petersburg, Fla.